Government College Of Arts and Crafts Assam or "GCAC" is one of the oldest art colleges in North-East India. It offers Bachelor Of Fine Arts (Degree)(B.F.A.) to students of North-East India.

History

The School of Art was initially started in a single room in the Don Bosco School at Paanbazar in 1947 by late Jibeswar Baruah.  Jibeswar Baruah was the head of the school till 1964.

In 1948 the school of art started to receive a recurring grant of Rs. 50.00 per month from the State Government. After few bad patches it moved to a rented house in Panbazar. It was a time when art was almost a taboo for the high or middle-class families to be taken it seriously.

The grant was subsequently increased to Rs. 150.00. In 1959 it was further increased to  Rs. 300.00 per month when it shared a portion of a two-storeyed building at Lakhtokia with the State Lalit Kala Akademi. Late  Jibeswar Barua was also the Secretary of state Lalit Kala Academi. The art classes were continued at the two rooms of the first floor which had three rooms, one room being used as an office.

During that period, one major break in the story rather history of the School came when Prof Humayun Kabir, the late Honourable Minister of Education and Scientific Research, Govt. of India inaugurated an exhibition arranged at the second floor of the District Library. The exhibits were collected from living artist and art students at the time and included works from the teachers and students of the school. It was indeed a tremendous success to far as the enthusiasm it created among the visitors which neared about three thousand was concerned, but not so with the Press where the event could hardly find a single mention.

The exhibition was organized at the instance of the late Shri B. P. Chaliha, the then Honourable Chief Minister, Assam. Another impeccable event was when Shri K. P. Padmanabhan Thampy, the art critic from  Thiruvananthapuram, Kerala,  was inaugurated an exhibition of works of contemporary artists. It was in 1961 the year of Rabindra Nath Tagore Centenary Celebration that the exhibition was organized.

The first annual exhibition of the school students was arranged during the Saraswati Puja in 1961. From then on, it was a regular feature every year, with few exceptions when circumstances were not in favour

Important people, art connoisseurs,  art lovers, men in high office, dignitaries, journalist, intellectuals were invited to inaugurate the exhibition and to grace the functions as honored guests. Satyajit Ray, the celebrated film maker visited the Tagore exhibition. Late Dr. Birinchi Kumar Baruah, Justice S. K. Dutta, Dr. m. Neog, late Joy Bhadra Hagjer, the then Education Minister, Assam, veteran journalist Shri S. C. Kakati, Prof. Nva Kanta Baruah,  honorable Ministers, Education and others inaugurated the exhibitions year after year.

A sad part of the story was on 31 January 1964, when Shri Jibeswar Baruah became mortally sick. The school was still not its full grown state.

After Jibeswar Baruah's sad demise, the Lalit Kala Akademi and the School of Art were separated; the assets belonging to the Lalit Kala were taken charge of by the new incumbent and those of the School of Art by his counterpart.  It was a divided house and the owner of the building also declined to rent the house further.

So, with a past which was not so palatable and the future or present equally uncertain, the School of  Art was headed by Sobha Brahma, moved to Santipur, Guwahati and established itself in a small rented building newly constructed. A new chapter in the history of the institution was commenced.

In the meantime, artists trained in the Visva-Bharti and the Govt. College of Art. Calcutta began to pour in. There was practically no place to absorb them, for art was never taken seriously. Some of them served the School for some time at certain periods. But, each of them was compelled to quit for obvious reasons; the minimum remuneration for their service was eluding them.

It was the hardest of times art was never taken for seriously the Press though friendly by the time, could help little; the Government officials and ministers were too busy with matters more of national importance. For them art could always wait, others are not.

It was the first phase of the history in its second phase in Sanitipur the school had its opportunity. It was the latter part of the sixties a benevolent Chief Minister, an equally benevolent Education Minister, legislators known for their service to art throughout their lives, late Bishnu Prasad Rabha, Late Lakshyadhar Chowdhury, Late Dr Bhupen Hazarika few lady social workers. They all made possible the Provincialisation of the Institution on first September, 1970. The present Govt. School of Art & Craft thus came into being.

In 1971-72, the control of the Govt. School of Art & Craft Assam was transferred to the newly created Directorate of Cultural Affairs from the Directorate of Public Instructions.

In 1979 twenty bighas of land was allocated to the School of Art,  under auspicious endeavors of Sri Jyoti Prasad Rajkhowa, when he was the D.C. Kamrup. Two Assam-type houses constructed at the time are being used as a student hostel and for sculptures including that of the principal.

The Gauhati University has lent affiliation to the Institution for starting Bachelor of Fine Arts Degree Course from the academic session of 1988-89 onward.

In 2005 September, the entire college which was running from a depreciated rented house at Santipur Hillside ever since 1968 moved to its newly constructed building at Basistha. The new campus and administrative building was conducted in a befitting manner by the honorable Chief Minister of Assam Sri Tarun Gogoi.

This is indeed a Historic event for the Government College OF Art & Crafts Assam. For the first time the institute has fulfilled its basic requirements for its students.  Now the institute also had fulfilled the primary requirements as a full-fledged Visual Art Institute as per with order such college of the UGC.

Courses
The Government College of Arts and Crafts Assam offers Bachelor Of Fine Arts in four subjects Applied Art, Graphics (print making), Painting and  Sculpture. It was a five-year course two years preparatory and three years major in one of those fours subjects.

Alumni
The Government College of Arts and Crafts Assam has numerous notable alumni in many fields.
List of Alumni : 
Temsuyanger Longkumer

References

government college of art craft from glory towards oblivion
directories
http://assam.gov.in/web/cultural-affairs-department

External links
 Government College of Art and Crafts Start Fighting for Their Rights after Decades of Deprivation

Art schools in India
Universities and colleges in Guwahati
Colleges affiliated to Gauhati University
Educational institutions established in 1947
1947 establishments in India